The Idiot Brain is a 2016 science book by Comedian and Neuroscientist Dr. Dean Burnett. The book was published in the United Kingdom by Faber and Faber.
It was shortlisted for the 2016 Goodreads Best Science & Technology Book Award.

Reception
Critical reception for The Idiot Brain has been positive, with The Independent describing it as "a wonderful introduction to neuroscience." and The Wall Street Journal as "Entertaining…[A] grand tour around modern cognitive science and psychology."

References

2016 non-fiction books
Science books
Faber and Faber books